Granit Rugova (born November 13, 1985) is a Kosovan former professional basketball player and was a member of the Kosovo national team.

Career 
Rugova started his career in Sigal Prishtina and played there until 2005, at which time he left to play for Trinity Valley Community College in Athens, Texas, United States.

In 2008, he came back to Sigal Prishtina to play there until 2013 when he had an injury that left him out of the court for almost 2 years. On August 10, 2015, he signed a one-year contract for KB Bashkimi. In August 2016, Rugova signed a two-year contract for Sigal Prishtina. On March 30, 2011, he scored a career-high 110 points against KB Mitrovica. That is a record in Kosovo Basketball League history.

See also 
 List of basketball players who have scored 100 points in a single game

References

External links 
Eurobasket.com profile
Balkan League profile 
FIBA.com profile

1985 births
Living people
Bashkimi Prizren players
Kosovan men's basketball players
KB Prishtina players
Shooting guards
Trinity Valley Cardinals men's basketball players